Vergennes is a village in Jackson County, Illinois, United States. The population was 298 at the 2010 census, down from 491 at the 2000 census.

On February 28, 2017, a strong tornado, possibly the same as the one that struck Perryville, Missouri, narrowly missed the center of town, though no fatalities occurred.

Geography
Vergennes is located in northern Jackson County at  (37.903152, -89.340111). Illinois Route 13 runs through the east side of the village, leading north  to Pinckneyville and south  to Murphysboro, the Jackson county seat.

Demographics

As of the census of 2000, there were 491 people, 120 households, and 93 families residing in the village. The racial makeup of the village was 73.32% White, 22.40% African American, 1.22% Native American, 0.41% Asian, 1.22% from other races, and 1.43% from two or more races. Hispanic or Latino of any race were 4.28% of the population.

There were 120 households, out of which 50.0% had children under the age of 18 living with them, 58.3% were married couples living together, 14.2% had a female householder with no husband present, and 22.5% were non-families. 19.2% of all households were made up of individuals, and 10.8% had someone living alone who was 65 years of age or older.  The average household size was 2.75 and the average family size was 3.16.

In the village, the population was spread out, with 52.1% under the age of 18, 7.1% from 18 to 24, 23.6% from 25 to 44, 10.8% from 45 to 64, and 6.3% who were 65 years of age or older.  The median age was 18 years. For every 100 females, there were 194.0 males.  For every 100 females age 18 and over, there were 104.3 males.

The median income for a household in the village was $36,458, and the median income for a family was $39,028. Males had a median income of $27,500 versus $18,333 for females. The per capita income for the village was $8,574.  About 16.9% of families and 19.1% of the population were below the poverty line, including 25.0% of those under age 18 and 31.6% of those age 65 or over.

References

Villages in Jackson County, Illinois
Villages in Illinois